Blessing Eleke (born 5 March 1996) is a Nigerian professional footballer who plays as a striker for  club Kashima Antlers. Before joining Kashima, Eleke had played for Gorica, Olimpija Ljubljana, Ashdod, Luzern, Beerschot, and lastly for Gençlerbirligi while on loan from Beerschot.

Professional career

Early life and career
Eleke grew up in Lagos with his three brothers and four sisters. He started playing football at Flying Sports Academy in his home country, before having an unsuccessful trial at Serie A club Sassuolo. Later on, he admitted that the transition from Nigeria to Europe was a difficult task to handle at the beginning.

Slovenia
Eleke signed for Olimpija Ljubljana in January 2016 for a reported fee of €750,000. On 10 April 2016, in a league fixture versus Zavrč, Olimpija's manager Nikolić reportedly called Eleke a "black idiot", for elaborately celebrating an injury-time equalizer in an eventual 1–1 draw. Nikolić's contract was eventually terminated by mutual consent on 18 April 2016., although Eleke asked club president Milan Mandarić not to sack the manager. Eleke revealed that, although he considered leaving the club, he did not want to see his coach sacked, as he did not believe in eye for an eye.

Israel and Switzerland
In August 2017, Eleke transferred to Israeli Premier League club Ashdod for a reported fee of €800,000. On 27 July 2018, Eleke signed a four-year contract with Swiss Super League club FC Luzern for a reported fee of approximately 1 million Swiss francs. After being cleared to play for Luzern, he managed to score on his debut, helping his club get past Lugano 4–2.

Gençlerbirligi SK
On 1 September 2021, Eleke was loaned out to Turkish club Gençlerbirligi SK for the rest of the season.

Kashima Antlers
On 1 August 2022, Kashima Antlers confirmed an agreement with K Beerschot VA for him to join on a complete transfer, becoming one of the few Nigerian footballers to play in Japan.

Honours
Olimpija Ljubljana
 PrvaLiga: 2015–16.

References

External links

1996 births
Living people
Nigerian footballers
Association football forwards
Nigerian expatriate footballers
ND Gorica players
NK Olimpija Ljubljana (2005) players
Slovenian PrvaLiga players
F.C. Ashdod players
FC Luzern players
K Beerschot VA players
Israeli Premier League players
Swiss Super League players
Belgian Pro League players
J1 League players
Expatriate footballers in Slovenia
Expatriate footballers in Israel
Expatriate footballers in Switzerland
Expatriate footballers in Belgium
Expatriate footballers in Japan
Nigerian expatriate sportspeople in Slovenia
Nigerian expatriate sportspeople in Israel
Nigerian expatriate sportspeople in Switzerland
Nigerian expatriate sportspeople in Belgium
Nigerian expatriate sportspeople in Japan